Raygun Gothic is a catchall term for a visual and architectural style that, when applied to retrofuturistic science fiction environments, incorporates various aspects of the Googie, Streamline Moderne and Art Deco architectural styles. Academic Lance Olsen has characterised Raygun Gothic as "a tomorrow that never was". It is inspired by Space Age, raypunk and atompunk subcultures.

The style has also been associated with architectural indulgence, and situated in the context of the golden age of modern design due to its use of features such as "single-support beams, acute angles, brightly colored paneling" as well as "shapes and cutouts showing motion".

Origin 

The term was coined by William Gibson in his 1981 story "The Gernsback Continuum":

See also 
 Mid-century modern
 Populuxe
 Space Age
 Tomorrowland
 Atompunk
 Dieselpunk

Notes 

4.^ "Loki"(2021).

References 

 

American architectural styles
William Gibson
Googie architecture
Science fiction themes
Retrofuturism
Raygun Gothic
Space Age